Neferu I ("the beauty") was the first queen of Ancient Egyptian Eleventh dynasty. She was a wife of the Pharaoh Mentuhotep I.

Her sons were Intef I and Intef II and she was a grandmother of Intef III and Queen Iah, his wife. She was also a great-grandmother of Neferu II.

She is mentioned on one stela.

It is possible that she is the same as the Queen Neferukayet, who is thought to be wife of Intef II. Her titles would be then: "King's wife, his beloved", "King's daughter" and "Royal Ornament".

References

Queens consort of the Eleventh Dynasty of Egypt
Mentuhotep I